The name Xavier University may refer to the following educational institutions:
Xavier University, in Cincinnati, Ohio
Xavier University of Louisiana, in New Orleans
Xavier University – Ateneo de Cagayan, in Cagayan de Oro, Philippines
Xavier University, Bhubaneswar, in Odisha, India
Xavier University School of Medicine, in Oranjestad, Aruba
St. Francis Xavier University, in Canada
X-Mansion, a fictional school in X-Men founded by Charles Francis Xavier.

See also
Saint Xavier University, a coeducational institution in Chicago, Illinois
List of schools named after Francis Xavier for a more comprehensive list of similarly named schools
XU (disambiguation)